The Government of Imo State also called The Imo State Government consists of elected representatives and appointed officials responsible for the government of Imo State, Nigeria. Imo State has a population of over 4 to 5 million people, and is one of the 36 states that make up the Federal Republic of Nigeria. The state government is composed of the executive, legislative, and judicial branches, whose powers are vested by the Constitution in the House of Assembly, the Governor and the High Court. The judiciary operates independently of the executive and the legislature. At the local level, elected officials are in charge of local government areas.

Executive 
The executive branch is headed by the Governor, assisted by the Deputy Governor, both elected. The governor appoints the principal state officers, the heads of parastatals, state-owned bodies, judicial officers, permanent secretaries and members of the Executive Council with the exception of the deputy. The Civil Service is administered by the head of service, a career civil servant, with each ministry managed by a permanent secretary. The commissioner is responsible for policy implementation, while the permanent secretary provides functional continuity and is responsible for operations within the ministry.

The Governor 

The Governor of Imo State is the highest ranking official, the chief executive officer and chief security officer of the statem He wields significant influence in matters relating to the governance of the state. As in most presidential systems, the governor is both the head of government and head of state. The governor is empowered by the Constitution to preside over the Executive Council, as well as to appoint, dismiss or reappoint its members–excluding the deputy governor–at will. In addition the governor may sign legislation passed by the House into law or may veto it. Legislation automatically becomes law after 30 days, with or without the governor's signaure.

A vote by a two-thirds majority in the House can overrule the governor. The same vote is required to initiate an impeachment process of the governor or his deputy. In all cases where the chief executive is unable to discharge his or her duties, the deputy governor assumes the office of Acting Governor until the governor resumes duty, or until election of a new one.

Since achieving statehood, Imo State has had a total of 7 governors.

The Deputy Governor 

The position of Deputy Governor of Imo State constitutes the vice-head of state and government, created when the federation returned to civilian authority under the Second Republic. Whoever holds the post is considered the second highest official in the executive branch. The deputy governor is also seen as the first official in line of succession to the Governor of Imo State, should the office be vacated.

Placid Njoku currently holds the position of the Deputy Governor of Imo State since January 15, 2020. The current governor Hope Uzodinma chose him to be his running-mate during the 2019 general elections.

Executive Council of Imo State

Principal Officers

Commissioners

Legislature 
The Imo State House of Assembly is the unicameral legislative body of the state government. It was established in 1979 by part II, section 84 of the Constitution of Nigeria, which states

. Led by a Speaker, the House of Assembly consists of 32 members, each elected to four-year terms in single-member constituencies by plurality. Its primary responsibility is to create laws for the peace, order and effective government of the state.

Powers 
There are numerous powers the Constitution expressly and specifically granted to the House of Assembly as they are necessary for its relevance. These include the powers to approve budget estimates presented to it by the executive; to make laws establishing the chargeable rates and the procedure to be used in assessing and collecting the rates charged by each local government council; confirm gubernatorial appointments, oversee and monitor activities of government agencies, review policy implementation strategies of the executive, summon before it and question a commissioner about the conduct of his or her ministry especially when the affairs of that ministry are under consideration and to initiate impeachment proceeding in order to secure the removal of the governor or the deputy.

Judiciary 
The administration of justice in Imo State is one of the fundamental duties of the judiciary of the state. This branch of government explains and applies the laws by hearing and eventually making decisions on various legal cases. It has a regulatory or supervisory body known as the Judicial Service Commission, which takes care of appointment, promotion and disciplinary issues of the judiciary.

The Chief Judge of Imo State is appointed by the Governor of Imo State, screened and confirmed by the Imo State House Assembly and recommendation of the National Judicial Council. The chief judge is the appointed head of the judicial branch. The chief judge is also the most senior judge and presiding member of the High Court of Justice. Among other responsibilities, the chief judge has the ceremonial duty of administering the oath of office of the Governor of Imo State. In modern tradition, the chief judge retires voluntarily at sixty years of age, or statutorily at sixty five.

Most appointments to the judiciary are made by the governor, but acting upon the recommendation of the National Judicial Council.

References 

Imo State
Imo